Maxime Boucheron, real name René Maximilien (9 March 1846 – 10 November 1896), was a French playwright and chansonnier.

Biography 
An employee at the Préfecture of Paris, he became an editor at Le Figaro where he was responsible for the theatre critics. His comic operas, vaudevilles, operettas and other works, written from the 1870s to the 1890s, were performed on the most significant Parisian stages of his time, including Théâtre des Folies-Dramatiques, Théâtre de la Renaissance and Théâtre des Variétés.

He is buried at the Père Lachaise Cemetery (47th division).

Works 
1878: Le Droit du seigneur, opéra comique in 3 acts, with Paul Burani
1879: Le Billet de logement, opéra-comique in 3 acts, with Paul Burani
1880: Le Ménage Popincourt, vaudeville in 1 act, with Raymond
1880: Le Voyage en Amérique, fantaisie, operetta in 4 acts, with Raymond
1882: Le Petit parisien, opéra comique in 3 acts, with Burani
1883: L'Ami d'Oscar, opéra comique in 1 act
1883: Le Bouquet de violettes, opéra comique in 1 act, with Georges Grisier
1887: Chanson du Point du jour, lyrics by Boucheron and Grisier, music by André Martinet
1888: Cocard et Bicoquet, comedy-vaudeville in 3 acts, with Hippolyte Raymond
1888: La divine comédie... française
1888: La Légende du magyar, opéra comique in 3 acts
1888: Mimi, vaudeville en 3 actes, with Raymond
1890: La D'moiselle, du téléphone, lyrics by Maxime Boucheron, music by André Martinet
1890: Le Roi des bonneteurs, Marpon et Flammarion
1890: Miss Helyett, opérette in 3 acts, 1891, music by Edmond Audran
1891: Le Mitron, vaudeville-operetta in 3 acts, with Mars
1891: Maldonne, comédie-bouffe in 1 act
1892: Sainte Freya, opéra comique in 3 acts, music by Audran
1892: Article de Paris, operetta in 3 actes, music by Audran
1894: Les Forains, operetta in 3 acts, with Antony Mars, music by Louis Varney
1895: La Duchesse de Ferrare, opéretta in 3 actes, music by Audran
1895: Le Pèlerinage, comedy in 4 acts, with Maurice Ordonneau
1896: Tante Agnès, operetta bouffa in 2 acts

Bibliography 
 Henry A. Parys, Histoire anecdotique de l'opérette, 1945, (p. 147)
 Manuel Gómez García, Diccionario Akal de Teatro, 1998, (p. 112)
 Kurt Gänzl, The Encyclopedia of the Musical Theatre: A-Gi, 2001, (p. 223)

Sources 
Jules Moiroux, Le cimetière du Père Lachaise, Paris, S. Mercadier, 1908 read online

19th-century French dramatists and playwrights
French chansonniers
Writers from Paris
1846 births
1896 deaths
Burials at Père Lachaise Cemetery